Richie Ryan may refer to:

Richie Ryan (footballer) (born 1985), Irish footballer
Richie Ryan (politician) (1929–2019), Irish former politician
Richie Ryan (Highlander), a character on the TV series Highlander: The Series

See also
Richard Ryan (disambiguation)